Dam safety may refer to:
 Dam safety systems - used for monitoring the safety status of dams
 Reservoir safety -  the risks to dams and reservoirs and the legislation and guidelines in place to ensure dams and reservoirs are safe.

Dams
Reservoirs
Safety